San Emeterio is a Roman Catholic church in the neighborhood of Sietes in the autonomous community of Asturias, Spain. It was established in the mid 16th century.

See also
Asturian art
Catholic Church in Spain

References

Churches in Asturias
16th-century establishments in Spain
16th-century Roman Catholic church buildings in Spain
Bien de Interés Cultural landmarks in Asturias